Deertrap Mountain is a   mountain in Zion National Park in Washington County, Utah, United States.

Description
Deertrap Mountain is composed of white Navajo Sandstone and set on the east rim of Zion Canyon. It is situated one mile southeast of Zion Lodge, and three miles northeast of park headquarters. The nearest neighbor is Mountain of the Sun, one-half mile to the west, and the nearest higher peak is Twin Brothers,  to the southwest. The East Temple is situated 1.1 mile to the south-southwest, and Ant Hill is set  to the southeast. Pine Creek originates at Deertrap, and the North Fork of the Virgin River drains precipitation runoff from this mountain. This feature's name was officially adopted April 4, 1934, by the U.S. Board on Geographic Names. It is believed that the Paiute drove mule deer onto the mesa here, trapping them for
food.

Climate
Spring and fall are the most favorable seasons to visit Deertrap Mountain. According to the Köppen climate classification system, it is located in a Cold semi-arid climate zone, which is defined by the coldest month having an average mean temperature below 32 °F (0 °C), and at least 50% of the total annual precipitation being received during the spring and summer.

See also

 List of mountains of Utah
 Geology of the Zion and Kolob canyons area
 Colorado Plateau

References

External links

Zion National Park National Park Service
 Weather forecast: Deertrap Mountain

Mountains of Utah
Zion National Park
Mountains of Washington County, Utah
Sandstone formations of the United States
Colorado Plateau